Diego Emiliano Silva Silva (born 17 May 1987 in Montevideo) is a Uruguayan footballer currently playing for Thawi Watthana Samut Sakhon United in Thai League 3.

Diego Silva in 2015 score 18 goals in 19 matches of the Lao Premier League. In the season from March to June 2016, score 9 goals in the first 10 games of the Lao Premier League. Finally finished the season 2016 in Lanexang United with 23 goals in 23 games played.

Diego in December 2016 sign a contract with Chainat Hornbill of Thailand and join the club for play in Thai League 2 in 2017. On 15 October 2017 Chainat Hornbill get the title of Champions of Thai League 2 with Diego scoring 12 goals and playing a full season of 28 games. In September 2018, Diego and Ayuttaya United were promoted to the Thai League 3 after winning the playoffs against Nara United.
January 2019 Diego signs for JSSP of Reunion Island League. At his first game Diego and JSSP won the Reunion Cup trophy. June 2019 JSSP debuts at the Coupe de France with a victory and 2 goals and 1 assist by Diego.

On 12 February 2022, Diego reached the mark of 100 goals in his professional career after a Hattrick vs Northern Tak for the thai league 3.

Biography
In February 2010, Silva was signed by the Romanian club Astra.

On 8 July 2013, he signed a contract with Cypriot side AEK Kouklia. Prior to the 2014 Latvian Higher League season Silva transferred to FC Jūrmala. He played 32 matches and scored 6 goals, becoming the club's top scorer in the league under the management of former Manchester United star Andrei Kanchelskis.
In January 2017 Diego signs for Chainat Hornbill of Thailand. On the first 6 games from February to March in the thai league2 scored 4 goals and become the top scorer of Chainat Hornbill. On the current season Diego have scoring 10 goals in 16 games played from March to July 2017.

References

External links
 
 
 Diego Emilio Silva Interview

1987 births
Living people
Uruguayan footballers
Association football forwards
Uruguayan Primera División players
Cypriot First Division players
Liga I players
Club Atlético River Plate (Montevideo) players
Racing Club de Montevideo players
C.D. Marathón players
FC Astra Giurgiu players
El Tanque Sisley players
Central Español players
AEK Kouklia F.C. players
FC Jūrmala players
Uruguayan expatriate footballers
Expatriate footballers in Romania
Expatriate footballers in Venezuela
Expatriate footballers in Argentina
Expatriate footballers in Cyprus
Expatriate footballers in Honduras
Expatriate footballers in Latvia
Expatriate footballers in Laos
Uruguayan expatriate sportspeople in Romania
Uruguayan expatriate sportspeople in Venezuela
Uruguayan expatriate sportspeople in Argentina
Uruguayan expatriate sportspeople in Cyprus
Uruguayan expatriate sportspeople in Honduras
Uruguayan expatriate sportspeople in Latvia
Uruguayan expatriate sportspeople in Laos